The colleges and universities of New York's Capital District are a varied lot, consisting of four year and two year institutions, universities and community colleges, private and public institutions.

Colleges and universities
Click on the double triangles at the top of a column to sort the table by that column.

Reference List 

C
Universities and colleges in New York (state)
Education in Capital District (New York)